Scalar–tensor–vector gravity (STVG) is a modified theory of gravity developed by John Moffat, a researcher at the Perimeter Institute for Theoretical Physics in Waterloo, Ontario. The theory is also often referred to by the acronym MOG (MOdified Gravity).

Overview
Scalar–tensor–vector gravity theory, also known as MOdified Gravity (MOG), is based on an action principle and postulates the existence of a vector field, while elevating the three constants of the theory to scalar fields. In the weak-field approximation, STVG produces a Yukawa-like modification of the gravitational force due to a point source. Intuitively, this result can be described as follows: far from a source gravity is stronger than the Newtonian prediction, but at shorter distances, it is counteracted by a repulsive fifth force due to the vector field.

STVG has been used successfully to explain galaxy rotation curves, the mass profiles of galaxy clusters, gravitational lensing in the Bullet Cluster, and cosmological observations without the need for dark matter. On a smaller scale, in the Solar System, STVG predicts no observable deviation from general relativity. The theory may also offer an explanation for the origin of inertia.

Mathematical details
STVG is formulated using the action principle.

We begin with the Einstein–Hilbert Lagrangian:

where  is the trace of the Ricci tensor,  is the gravitational constant,  is the determinant of the metric tensor , while  is the cosmological constant.

We introduce the Maxwell-Proca Lagrangian for the STVG covector field :

The STVG action integral takes the form

where  is the ordinary matter Lagrangian density.

Spherically symmetric, static vacuum solution

The field equations of STVG can be developed from the action integral using the variational principle. First a test particle Lagrangian is postulated in the form

where  is Newton's constant of gravitation.

where  is determined from cosmological observations, while for the constants  and  galaxy rotation curves yield the following values:

where  is the mass of the Sun. These results form the basis of a series of calculations that are used to confront the theory with observation.

Agreement with observations
STVG/MOG has been applied successfully to a range of astronomical, astrophysical, and cosmological phenomena.

On the scale of the Solar System, the theory predicts no deviation from the results of Newton and Einstein. This is also true for star clusters containing no more than a few million solar masses.

The theory accounts for the rotation curves of spiral galaxies, correctly reproducing the Tully–Fisher law.

STVG is in good agreement with the mass profiles of galaxy clusters.

STVG can also account for key cosmological observations, including:
 The acoustic peaks in the cosmic microwave background radiation;
 The accelerating expansion of the universe that is apparent from type Ia supernova observations;
 The matter power spectrum of the universe that is observed in the form of galaxy-galaxy correlations.

Problems and criticism
An 2017 article on Forbes by Ethan Siegel states that the Bullet Cluster still "proves dark matter exists, but not for the reason most physicists think". There he argues in favor of dark matter over non-local gravity theories, such as STVG/MOG. Observations show that in "undisturbed" galaxy clusters the reconstructed mass from gravitational lensing is located where matter is distributed, and a separation of matter from gravitation only seems to appear after a collision or interaction has taken place. According to Ethan Siegel: "Adding dark matter makes this work, but non-local gravity would make differing before-and-after predictions that can't both match up, simultaneously, with what we observe."

See also
 Modified Newtonian dynamics
 Nonsymmetric gravitational theory
 Tensor–vector–scalar gravity

References

Theories of gravity
Theoretical physics
Astrophysics